Stroud by-election may refer to:

 January 1874 Stroud by-election
 May 1874 Stroud by-election
 July 1874 Stroud by-election
 1875 Stroud by-election
 1931 Stroud by-election

Disambiguation pages